is a Japanese professional baseball player. He was born on March 27, 1969. He debuted in 1987. 2013 was his twenty-seventh year in professional baseball. He has not played much for the past four seasons, due to his becoming a coach as well. Nakajima became the manager for the Orix Buaffaloes in 2020, and lead the team to two consecutive Japan series before winning in 2022.

References

1969 births
Baseball people from Akita Prefecture
Hankyu Braves players
Hokkaido Nippon-Ham Fighters players
Japanese baseball players
Living people
Managers of baseball teams in Japan
Nippon Professional Baseball catchers
Orix BlueWave players
Orix Braves players
Orix Buffaloes managers
Seibu Lions players
Yokohama BayStars players